Mycoplasma penetrans is a species of Gram-positive bacteria. It is pathogenic, though many infected show no symptoms. It is a sexually transmitted disease, though an infant may be infected during birth.

Description
It has an elongated shape and its cells possess two internal compartments, one packed with granules, the other filled with coarse granules (consistent with ribosomal structures). The organism has properties of adherence through a specific organelle called the tip organelle. M. Penetrans has a coding sequence (MYPE1570) similar to that of MYPE470 in Mycoplasma pneumoniae which codes for an accessory protein that aids in cytadherence, the adherence to respiratory epithelium. This similarity suggests M. penetrans could attach to host cells through cytadherence. Also, the CDS MYPE1550, which is near MYPE1570, of M. penetrans is orthologous to the hemadsorption protein HMW2 of M pneumoniae, suggesting the potential for M. penetrans to attach to and invade red blood cells.

Virulence factors
Mycoplasma penetrans, like many bacteria, exhibits a mechanism by which it can avoid an immune response in the host cells. This avoidance of immune responses is known as a virulence factor. The virulence factor that M. penetrans displays is antigenic variation, the ability to exchange or switch antigens against which the host cell produces antibodies. The mpl gene encodes for the bacteria's antigens and, like most genes, it contains a promoter region. In M. penetrans, this promoter region can undergo reversible inversion, allowing for variation in antigen production and, thus, the source for M. penetrans antigenic variation.

Diseases
Mycoplasma penetrans has been shown to hinder p53, a tumor suppressing gene that aids in regulating the cell cycle. There have also been cases of malignant pleural effusion, when patients exhibited chronic M. penetrans infection with various immunodeficiencies (such as HIV infections or anticancer treatment). This particular species is also a sexually transmitted disease and one cause of pelvic inflammatory disease.

References

Further reading

External links

LPSN
Type strain of Mycoplasma penetrans at BacDive -  the Bacterial Diversity Metadatabase
Mycoplasma penetrans Genome Project

Bacteria described in 1992
penetrans